Milton Loeb Hanauer (5 August 1908 – 16 April 1988) was a public school principal, chess master and Marshall Chess Club official.

Born in Harrison, New York, He is best known for running the New York school competition that became known as the Hanauer League and for writing the book Chess Made Simple.

His playing career is not well known, but he played on the silver medal winning US team in the 2nd Chess Olympiad at The Hague 1928, he qualified for four US Championships, and he won games from Reuben Fine and Isaac Kashdan.

Further reading
Milton Hanauer, Chess Made Simple, Made Simple Books / Doubleday & Company Inc (1957) 
Andrew Soltis, Hanauer, Chess Life, August 2008

References

External links

 (1928 Chess Olympiad)

1908 births
1988 deaths
20th-century American Jews
American chess players
American chess writers
Jewish chess players
Chess Olympiad competitors
People from Harrison, New York
20th-century chess players